Maria Caterina Zambon FMedSci FRCPath, is a British virologist,  director of reference microbiology for Public Health England, and a professor.

In 1984, Zambon earned a PhD from the University of London (Imperial College) with a thesis titeled "Inhibition of influenza virus replication by 1-aminoadamantane". 
This work on "the mechanism of action of amantadine ... led directly to the identification of a novel class of viral proteins, viral ion channels (M2 protein)",
a research in which she participated furtherly.

In 2011, she was elected a fellow of the Academy of Medical Sciences. She is a fellow of the Royal College of Pathologists.

Zambon is one of the 23 attendees of the Scientific Advisory Group for Emergencies (Sage).
She was a member of the Coronaviridae Study Group of the International Committee on Taxonomy of Viruses and contributed to the scientific description of MERS-CoV's taxonomy.

Maria Zambon and her PHE colleague Joanna Ellis contributed to the development of the first real-time RT-PCR test for SARS-CoV-2, which was led by Christian Drosten.

Her main research areas include influenza vaccination and influenza hemagglutination inhibition.

References

British virologists
Women virologists
Living people
Year of birth missing (living people)
Place of birth missing (living people)